Livistoninae is a subtribe of plants in the family Arecaceae. Species in the subtribe are found throughout Indomalaya and Australasia. Genera in the subtribe are:

Livistona – Indomalaya, Australasia, Gulf of Aden
Licuala – Indochina, Malesia, Melanesia
Johannesteijsmannia – Malay Peninsula and nearby parts of Sumatra and Borneo
Pholidocarpus – Malaysia, northern Indonesia
Saribus – Malesia, New Guinea, Island Melanesia
Lanonia – southern China, Indochina, Java

See also 
 List of Arecaceae genera

References

External links 

 
Arecaceae subtribes